Micro Commandos is a PC game developed and published by Monte Cristo.
The player controls tiny aliens from another planet to look for a so-called "Ultimate Weapon". They lead the aliens through 14 missions in the world of "the big people" exploring unusual settings like a museum, subway, pizzeria....
The player has to collect resources of food and material to feed and construct vehicles and buildings for the aliens. They also have to fight off another alien race looking for the Ultimate Weapon as well as bugs, hamsters and the family cat.

External links

2002 video games
Real-time strategy video games
Video games developed in France
Windows games
Windows-only games
Strategy First games